Lioglyphostoma rectilabrum is a species of sea snail, a marine gastropod mollusk in the family Pseudomelatomidae, the turrids and allies.

Description

Distribution

References

 McLean, J.H. & Poorman, R. (1971) New species of tropical Eastern Pacific Turridae. The Veliger, 14, 89–113

External links
 
 Gastropods.com: Lioglyphostoma rectilabrum

rectilabrum
Gastropods described in 1971